Pachastrellidae is a family of sea sponges.

Genera 
Acanthotriaena Vacelet, Vasseur & Lévi, 1976
Ancorella Lendenfeld, 1907
Brachiaster Wilson, 1925
Characella Sollas, 1886
Nethea Sollas, 1888
Pachastrella Schmidt, 1868
Triptolemma de Laubenfels, 1955

References

External links 
 

Tetractinellida
Taxa named by Henry John Carter